Elliptic cylindrical coordinates are a three-dimensional orthogonal coordinate system that results from projecting the two-dimensional elliptic coordinate system in the
perpendicular -direction.  Hence, the coordinate surfaces are prisms of confocal ellipses and hyperbolae.  The two foci 
, respectively, on the -axis of the Cartesian coordinate system.

Basic definition

The most common definition of elliptic cylindrical coordinates  is

These definitions correspond to ellipses and hyperbolae.  The trigonometric identity

shows that curves of constant  form ellipses, whereas the hyperbolic trigonometric identity

shows that curves of constant  form hyperbolae.

Scale factors

whereas the remaining scale factor .  
Consequently, an infinitesimal volume element equals

and the Laplacian equals 

the scale factors into the general formulae found in orthogonal coordinates.

Alternative definition

Hence, the curves of constant  are ellipses, whereas the curves of constant  are hyperbolae. The coordinate  must belong to the interval [-1, 1], whereas the  
coordinate must be greater than or equal to one.
 
For any point in the (x,y) plane, the sum  of its distances to the foci equals , whereas their difference  equals .

A drawback of these coordinates is that they do not have a 1-to-1 transformation to the Cartesian coordinates

Alternative scale factors

The scale factors for the alternative elliptic coordinates  are 

and, of course, .  Hence, the infinitesimal volume element becomes 

and the Laplacian equals

Other differential operators such as  
and  can be expressed in the coordinates  by substituting 
the scale factors into the general formulae 
found in orthogonal coordinates.

Applications
The classic applications of elliptic cylindrical coordinates are in solving partial differential equations, 
e.g., Laplace's equation or the Helmholtz equation, for which elliptic cylindrical coordinates allow a 
separation of variables.  A typical example would be the electric field surrounding a 
flat conducting plate of width .

The three-dimensional wave equation, when expressed in elliptic cylindrical coordinates, may be solved by separation of variables, leading to the Mathieu differential equations.

The geometric properties of elliptic coordinates can also be useful.  A typical example might involve 
an integration over all pairs of vectors  and  
that sum to a fixed vector , where the integrand 
(In such a case, one would position  between the two foci and aligned with the -axis, i.e., .) For concreteness,  and  could represent the momenta of a particle and its decomposition products, respectively, and the integrand might involve the kinetic energies of the products (which are proportional to the squared lengths of the momenta).

Bibliography

  
  Same as Morse & Feshbach (1953), substituting uk for ξk.

External links
MathWorld description of elliptic cylindrical coordinates

Three-dimensional coordinate systems
Orthogonal coordinate systems